Green Creek is an unincorporated community located within Middle Township, in Cape May County, New Jersey, United States. It is located on Route 47 (Delsea Drive). It is a very low-lying area with a highest elevation of just above . It is mostly residential with areas of agriculture and commerce along the main road, Delsea Drive (Route 47). The United States Postal Service ZIP Code is 08219. The post office was established in 1829 with Matthew Marcy as the first postmaster.

Geography
Green Creek is located at  (39.046224, -74.901283). It lies 13 feet (4 m) above sea level.

Environment
Aside from residential usage, Green Creek comprises a mixture of broad-leaf woodland and salt marsh. There is an area of protected dry grassland part of the Cape May National Wildlife Refuge, located off Burleigh Road.

References

Middle Township, New Jersey
Unincorporated communities in Cape May County, New Jersey
Unincorporated communities in New Jersey